Frontiers of Computer Science is a bimonthly peer-reviewed scientific journal in English, co-published by Springer and Higher Education Press. It publishes research papers, review articles, and letters in computer science, including system architecture, software, artificial intelligence, theoretical computer science, networks and communication, information systems, multimedia and graphics, information security, etc. The editor-in-chief is Wei LI (Beihang University, China); the executive editors-in-chief are Zhang XIONG (Beihang University, China) and Zhi-Hua ZHOU (Nanjing University, China).

Abstracting and indexing 
The journal is abstracted and indexed in:
 Science Citation Index Expanded (SciSearch)
 Journal Citation Reports/Science Edition
 SCOPUS
 INSPEC
 Zentralblatt Math
 Google Scholar
 ACM Digital Library
 Chinese Science Citation Database
 Current Contents/Engineering
 Computing and Technology
 DBLP
 EI-Compendex
 Expanded Academic
 OCLC
 SCImago

References

External links 
 Official website

Computer science journals
Bimonthly journals
English-language journals
Publications established in 2007